Passarella is a surname. Notable people with the surname include:

Art Passarella (1909–1981), American major league baseball umpire and actor
Daniel Passarella (born 1953), Argentine footballer 
Passarella (Guinean footballer) (born 1971), Guinean footballer and football manager
John Passarella, American author
Lee Passarella, American writer and senior literary editor